Soyuz TMA-04M was a spaceflight to Low Earth orbit that transported three members of the Expedition 31 crew to the International Space Station (ISS), which was launched on 15 May 2012 and landed on 17 September 2012. TMA-04M was the Soyuz spacecraft's 113th flight since its initial launch in 1967, and the fourth launch of the improved Soyuz TMA-M series (first launched 7 October 2010). As per the mission plan, the spacecraft remained docked to the space station to serve as an emergency escape vehicle during Expedition 31.

The mission was successfully launched to the International Space Station from the Baikonur Cosmodrome in Kazakhstan on Tuesday, 15 May 2012, at 3:01:23 UTC (9:01:23 local time). The Soyuz docked successfully with the ISS on 17 May at 4:36 UTC. The spacecraft carried to the ISS a three-person crew (Gennady Padalka, Russia; Sergei Revin, Russia; Joseph Acaba, United States). The mission landed successfully in Kazakhstan on 17 September 2012, at 2:53 UTC.

Crew

Backup crew

Spacecraft
Soyuz TMA-04M was the fourth mission using the upgraded Soyuz TMA-M spacecraft, which has a modernised flight control system and a reduced mass. The spacecraft was designed and manufactured by S.P. Korolev Rocket and Space Corporation Energia, the largest company of the Russian space industry.

Mission highlights

Soyuz TMA-04M was successfully launched to the International Space Station from the Baikonur Cosmodrome in Kazakhstan on Tuesday, 15 May 2012, at 3:01:23 UTC (9:01:23 local Baikonur time). The spacecraft docked with the International Space Station on Thursday, 17 May at 4:36 UTC, linking to the Poisk docking module.

After the departure of Soyuz TMA-03M on 1 June the crew members of TMA-04M conducted the first portion of Expedition 32 until the commencement of the second portion with the arrival of the remaining crew members aboard Soyuz TMA-05M in mid-July. The spacecraft undocked from the ISS at 23:09 UTC on 16 September and landed at 2:53 UTC on September 17 in Kazakhstan.

Gallery

References

Crewed Soyuz missions
Spacecraft launched in 2012
Spacecraft which reentered in 2012
Spacecraft launched by Soyuz-FG rockets